This is a list of nature centres in the United Kingdom.

England

Northern Ireland
ECOS Millennium Environmental Centre, Ballymena, County Antrim
WWT Castle Espie, Comber, County Down

Scotland
Aigas Field Centre, Beauly, Inverness-shire
Falls of Clyde Visitor Centre and Wildlife Reserve, Lanark, Scotland
Loch of the Lowes Visitor Centre and Wildlife Reserve, Dunkeld, Perth and Kinross
Montrose Basin Visitor Centre and Wildlife Reserve, Montrose, Lanarkshire
Scottish Seabird Centre, North Berwick, East Lothian
University of Aberdeen Natural History Centre, Aberdeen
Water of Leith Visitor Centre, Edinburgh
WDCS Wildlife Centre, Spey Bay, Moray
WDCS Dolphin And Seal Centre, North Kessock
WWT Caerlaverock, Dumfries and Galloway

Wales
Pensychnant Conservation Centre & Nature Reserve, Conwy, Clwyd
WWT National Wetlands Centre Llanelli, Llanelli, Carmarthenshire

 
United Kingdom
Nature centres